The Province of 16 Szepes Towns was a seat, an autonomous administrative division, within Szepes County, located in the Kingdom of Hungary, and later in Austria-Hungary. Its capital was Spišská Nová Ves.

It existed from 1778 to 1785, and from 1791 to 1876. It was established on 5 June 1778, with the unification of the Province of 13 Szepes Towns and the Dominion of Lubowla into one entity. The territory was disestablished on 1 November 1785, with its lands being directly administrated by Szepes County until October 1791, when it was reestablished. It existed until 1876, when it was again disestablished, being given under direct administration of Szepes County.

History 
On 5 June 1778, Maria Theresa, Queen of Hungary, had confirmed old privileges of the towns of the Province of 13 Szepes Towns, and re-established their autonomy. It was unified with the Dominion of Lubowla, forming the Province of 16 Szepes Towns, with Spišská Nová Ves as its capital.

The province was disestablished on 1 November 1785, in the effect of the Josephine reforms, done under the rule of Joseph II. The towns lost their autonomy and were given back under the direct administration of Szepes County. It was reestablished back in October 1791, after the reforms were abolished.

In 1849, the Provincial Count was appointed as the Government Commissioner, de jure, turning the province into the Government Commissariat of 16 Towns. It got disestablished in 1876, during the period of Bach's absolutism. The towns lost their autonomy and were given back under the direct administration of Szepes County.

Towns 
 Spišská Nová Ves
 Spišské Vlachy
 Spišské Podhradie
 Poprad
 Veľká
 Spišská Sobota
 Stráže pod Tatrami
 Matejovce
 Spišská Belá
 Vrbov
 Ľubica
 Ruskinovce
 Tvarožná
 Stará Ľubovňa
 Podolínec
 Hniezdne

Citations

Notes

References

Bibliography 
 Zuzanna Krempaská, Sixteen Scepus Towns from 1412 to 1876. Spišska Nova Vés, Spiš Museum. ISBN 9788085173062.
 Vladimír Hajko (editor): Encyklopédia Slovenska: súhrn poznatkov o minulosti a prítomnosti Slovenska, vol. 4, N-Q. Bratislava: Veda, 1980. p. 569.

Province of 16 Szepes Towns
Province of 16 Szepes Towns
Province of 16 Szepes Towns
Province of 16 Szepes Towns
Province of 16 Szepes Towns
 18th-century establishments in Europe
 18th-century disestablishments in Europe
 19th-century disestablishments in Europe
 States and territories established in 1778
 States and territories disestablished in 1785
 States and territories established in 1791
 States and territories disestablished in 1776